The men's individual recurve archery competition at the 2015 Summer Universiade was held in the International Archery Center, Gwangju, South Korea from July 4 to 8, 2015. 68 archers from 32 countries entered the competition. World champion Lee Seung-yun set a new Universiade record in the ranking round.

Ranking round

The ranking round took place on 4 July 2015 to determine the seeding for the knockout rounds. It consisted of two rounds of 36 arrows, with a maximum score of 720.

Elimination rounds

Finals

References

External links
Schedule and results

Summer Universiade
2015 Summer Universiade events
International archery competitions hosted by South Korea